Mel Winkler (October 23, 1941 – June 11, 2020) was an American actor, perhaps best known as the voice of Aku Aku in the Crash Bandicoot video games, from Crash Bandicoot: Warped to Crash Twinsanity.

Early life 
Winkler was born in St. Louis, Missouri on October 23, 1941.

Career 
In 1969, Winkler began a tap dancing career in Anything Goes. In 1970s and 1980s, He moved to his home town St. Louis and New York City. Though Winkler mostly appeared in minor live-action roles, such as Melvin in Doc Hollywood, in 1977 and 1978 he appeared in a two-show Anything Goes (1977) as Lord Evelyn Oakleigh and West Side Story (1978) as Action. He also spent time on Broadway, appearing in The Great White Hope in 1968, in August Wilson's Joe Turner's Come and Gone in 1988 and in Neil Simon's Proposals from 1997 to 1998. He is the voice of the guardian mask Aku Aku in the Crash Bandicoot series, Lucius Fox in The New Batman Adventures and Johnny Snowman in the TV series Oswald. In 2004, he appeared in The Tap Dance Kid as Dipsey.

Death 
Winkler died in his sleep on June 11, 2020. The cause of his death was not disclosed. The video game Crash Bandicoot 4: It's About Time is dedicated to his memory.

Filmography

Film

Television

Video games

References

External links 
 

1941 births
2020 deaths
African-American male actors
American male film actors
American male television actors
American male voice actors
American male video game actors
American tap dancers
Male actors from St. Louis
20th-century American male actors
21st-century American male actors
20th-century African-American people
21st-century African-American people